Morningside is a suburb in the City of Brisbane, Queensland, Australia.

Geography 

There are many older-style weatherboard and chamferboard homes in this area as well as modern units and townhouses.

History
Morningside is said to be named after a local estate belonging to David Longlands. The name of the estate itself likely referred either to the Scottish town, or to the estate's location on the eastern side of Brisbane. It is also said to be named for the sight of the morning sun catching the banks of the river.

The area was first settled by Europeans in the early 1870s. The land at that time was used mainly for agriculture; in particular, dairy, sugarcane and tobacco production.

The old suburb of Colmslie was merged into Morningside. At the corner of Bennetts and Wynnum Roads is the historic Bulimba Cemetery (also known as the Balmoral Cemetery) dating from 1875. Morningside started off as a rural area with small dairy and tobacco farms before becoming a popular residential area in the post-war boom.

In December 1884, "The Richmond Park Estate" made up of 145 allotments, was advertised to be auctioned by Hooker, Son & Elliott. A map advertising the auction shows an area bordering Main Cleveland Road, between what is now Wynnum Road and Richmond Road in Morningside. The Bulimba Divisional Board offices and grounds are clearly marked.

In March 1920, the area of land on the hill adjacent to Morningside Station, was offered for sale as the "Morningside Estate", to be auctioned by A.M. Newman. A map of the estate shows the allotments offered for sale. Coronation Park estate Morningside was advertised for sale on 21 July 1923. The estate is centred on the Keralgerie Park in Morningside. Marooba Estate on the corner of Riding Road and Lawson Street was advertised for sale on 25 August 1928, 20 business and residential blocks were auctioned.

A quarry was established post-World War I to obtain bluestone for roads in the growing suburbs. By 1940, the quarry had been filled in to provide a swimming pool for residents. In 1948, the Australian diving championships were held in the quarry swimming pool. After 2 drownings and the detection of typhoid in the water by 1952, the quarry was drained and filled to create Keralgerie Park.

Until 13 April 1969, electric trams skirted the western edge of the suburb, operating along Wynnum Road and Riding Road.

The Cairncross Dockyard was constructed in Morningside between 1942 and 1944. The facility closed in 2014, and as of 2016 was to be redeveloped into a commercial and residential area.

Amenities

There are two shopping centres in Morningside; Morningside Central, located on the corner of Junction Road and Wynnum Road, and Colmslie Plaza on the opposite side of Junction Road. The Colmslie Hotel is located next to Colmslie Plaza.

The Balmoral Cemetery is located at the corner of Wynnum and Bennetts Road, Morningside. Opened in 1875, this is no longer an active cemetery, but existing graves can be re-used for family members. It is also known as Bulimba Cemetery and Morningside Cemetery and was historically known as Kangaroo Point Cemetery.

Education
Morningside State School is a government primary (Prep-6) school for boys and girls at 67 Pashen Street. In 2017, the school had an enrolment of 454 students with 37 teachers (29 full-time equivalent) and 26 non-teaching staff (15 full-time equivalent). It includes a special education program. The school has 26 classrooms, with a swimming pool, tennis court and a large oval.

In October 2018, a major fire broke out at Morningside State School which caused extensive damage to the school. The school re-opened one week later with the assistance and hard work of the entire school community.

There are no secondary schools in Morningside. The nearest secondary school is Balmoral State High School at 259 Thynne Rd, Balmoral.

Heritage listings 
Morningside has three heritage-listed sites:
 82 Colmslie Road: former Commonwealth Acetate of Lime Factory
67 Pashen Street: Morningside State School
 105 Pashen Street: Balmoral Fire Station
 580 Wynnum Road: Morningside Air Raid Shelter

Transport
Morningside's main road is Wynnum Road, and Morningside station connects the suburb to the Cleveland railway line.

Notable residents
The Voss brothers, Michael and Brett, who play for the Brisbane Lions and St Kilda Football Club respectively. Brett is still playing, whilst Michael is the former coach of the Brisbane Lions.
Fazerdaze, aka Amelia Murray, a musician from the area who released her first studio album with "Morningside" as the title of the project
 Mal Michael, Australian rules footballer

References

External links

 

 
Suburbs of the City of Brisbane
1872 establishments in Australia
Populated places established in 1872